Broadmarsh bus station is a bus station serving the city of Nottingham, England.

The new bus station is situated in Nottingham City Centre adjacent to the former Broadmarsh Shopping Centre, underneath its multi-storey car park.

Services
National Express services moved from their temporary terminus outside Nottingham Railway Station to Bays 10 and 11 at the new bus station on 14 June 2022, and their new facilities within the bus station were opened on the same date.

The new bus station has been allocated a 10-year lease by Nottingham City Council, with bus services planned to resume from October 2022.

Kinchbus service 9 to Loughborough and a number of Trent Barton services are due to use the new station from 2 October

Redevelopment
The previous bus station closed on 9 July 2017 as part of a redevelopment of the area.

A replacement car park and bus station with retail units has been constructed with the new car park opening in November 2021 and is a part of the wider redevelopment of the demolished shopping centre area, including a new central library, named as Southern Gateway. The bus station was intended to open at the same time, but was delayed.

Gallery

See also
Victoria bus station, Nottingham

References

External links
Broadmarsh Bus Station picture - Flickr

Bus stations in Nottinghamshire
Buildings and structures in Nottingham
Transport in Nottingham
2017 disestablishments in England